Pirogovo is a rural locality (a village) in Penkinskoye Rural Settlement, Kameshkovsky District, Vladimir Oblast, Russia. The population was 16 as of 2010.

Geography 
Pirogovo is located 36 km south of Kameshkovo (the district's administrative centre) by road. Lubenkino is the nearest rural locality.

References 

Rural localities in Kameshkovsky District